Bryan Patrick Fenton (born 1965) is a United States Army general who serves as the 13th commander of the United States Special Operations Command since 30 August 2022. He most recently served as the 16th commander of the Joint Special Operations Command from July 2021 to August 2022. and as the senior military assistant to the Secretary of Defense from 12 August 2019 to June 2021. He previously served as the deputy commander of United States Indo-Pacific Command. Fenton is a graduate of the University of Notre Dame.

Awards and decorations

References

External link

|-

|-

|-

|-

1965 births
Living people
University of Notre Dame alumni
United States Army generals
Recipients of the Defense Superior Service Medal
Recipients of the Legion of Merit